John Hancock College Prep High School (commonly known as Hancock High School) is a public four–year selective enrollment high school located in the West Elsdon neighborhood on the southwest side of Chicago, Illinois, United States. Hancock is named for American Revolution patriot and statesman John Hancock. The school is a part of the Chicago Public Schools district.

History
Hancock opened as an elementary school in 1999 and was converted into a high school in 2002. Now called Hancock College Prep HS and located at 5437 W 64th Pl, Chicago, IL 60638, Hancock's current school building was completed in 2021 and the ribbon cutting ceremony was on August 27, 2021. It opened to students on August 30, 2021. 

Hancock's former school building was originally known as Lourdes High School which opened in 1936 as the separate girls’ school of the De La Salle Institute. In September 2015, the Chicago school district changed Hancock into a "selective enrollment" school, and its attendance boundary is being phased out.

Among other things, the new building has 28 standard classrooms, computer labs, specialized subject suites, a black box theater, and a media center. It will serve 1,000 students.

Athletics
Hancock competes in the Chicago Public League (CPL) and is a member of the Illinois High School Association (IHSA). Hancock sport teams are nicknamed Eagles. The boys' baseball team were regional champions in 2007–08.

References

Educational institutions established in 1999
1999 establishments in Illinois
Public high schools in Chicago